MANRS ("Mutually Agreed Norms for Routing Security") is an Internet Society-supported activity aimed at securing global Internet routing. Its main participants are Internet Service Providers  (ISPs), cloud providers, Internet Exchange Points (IXPs) and Content Delivery Networks (CDNs).

Members of MANRS include:

 Network Operators like Workonline Communications, Telcom Internet, Backspace Technologiers (and more).
 Internet Exchange Points like France IX, NIX.CZ, NAPAfrica (and more).
 CDNs and Cloud Providers like Amazon, Cloudflare, Facebook, Google, and Netflix.

MANRS also operates the MANRS Observatory, a service that monitors the Internet for routing problems.

In May 2020, amidst the COVID-19 pandemic, MANRS announced that more than 500 autonomous systems had joined the initiative.

References

External links 

Internet security